"Woman" is a song by British rapper Little Simz featuring fellow British singer Cleo Sol. It was released on 6 May 2021, as the second single from the former's fourth studio album Sometimes I Might Be Introvert (2021). The song was written by Simz, Sol, and record producer Inflo.

A retro hip-hop song, "Woman" discusses women's lives in different countries. Simz wrote the song to thank women who inspired her, stating, "It's empowering, it's inspiring; I wanted to say thank you and I wanted to celebrate them." The chorus is sung by Sol.

Release and composition
Simz and Sol first collaborated on the song "Selfish" from Simz's third studio album Grey Area (2019). Aside from their collaboration in "Woman" for Simz's fourth studio album Sometimes I Might Be Introvert (2021), Sol provided guest vocals on the album's lead single "Introvert".

"Woman" was released on 6 May 2021, by Simz's label Age 101, as the second single from the album. A lyric video was uploaded to Simz's YouTube channel on 10 June 2021.

Consequences Nina Corcoran described "Woman" as a "low-key retro hip-hop number that sees Simz rapping about the women around the world who inspire [Simz] to carry on." The song contains an organ and snappy snares. The rapper, who described the song as "empowering" and "inspiring", stated that she wrote the song "to say thank you and I wanted to celebrate" women. Sol sings in the chorus: "I love how you go from zero to one hundred/And leave the dust behind, you've got this/All action, no talk". Simz wanted to create a song dedicated to women, and explained with Vulture the inspiration behind the song:

Music video
The music video was released the same day as the single, and was directed by Simz. It featured guest appearances from Jourdan Dunn, Joy Crookes, and Denai Moore. A trailer was uploaded on Simz's YouTube account on 3 May 2021. As of December 2022, the video has received over 5 million views.

Live performances
Simz first performed "Woman" on The Tonight Show Starring Jimmy Fallon on 16 August 2021. On 28 May 2021, she performed the song at the Later... with Jools Holland. The song was sung as a medley with "Introvert" at the 2022 Brit Awards. "Woman" was also included on the rapper's set list at Glastonbury Festival 2022, in which Sol joined her onstage.

Credits and personnel
Credits adapted from the liner notes of Sometimes I Might Be Introvert.

 Little Simzlead vocals, songwriting
 Cleo Solfeatured vocals, songwriting
 Inflobacking vocals, songwriting, drums, bass, guitar, synthesizer, production
 Caroline Adeyemiadditional vocals
 Graham Godfreypercussion
 Miles Jamesrhythm guitar, bass
 Kadeem Clarkeadditional synthesizer, organ, piano, keyboards
 Rosie Danversorchestral arrangements
 Ben Baptiemixing, engineering
 Richard Woodcraftmixing, engineering
 Sophie Ellisengineering assistance
 Matt Coltonmastering

References

External links
 

2021 singles
Little Simz songs
Songs written by Little Simz